Solms-Rödelheim-Assenheim was a County of southern Hesse and eastern Rhineland-Palatinate, Germany. The House of Solms<ref>See German article on the House of Solms or French article Maison de Solms.</ref> had its origins at Solms, Hesse.

Solms-Rödelheim-Assenheim was thrice created by a union of the Counts of Solms-Assenheim and Solms-Rödelheim, and on the first two occasions repartitioned into those statelets. Solms-Rödelheim-Assenheim was mediatised to Hesse-Kassel (or Hesse-Cassel) and Hesse-Darmstadt in 1806.

Counts of Solms-Rödelheim-Assenheim

First creation: 1635–1699

 Johann August, Count 1635–1680 (1623-1680), second son of Johann Georg II, Count of Solms-Baruth  Johann Karl Eberhard, Count 1680–1699 (1657-1699), eldest surviving sonSecond creation: 1722–28
Ludwig Heinrich, Count 1722-1728 (1667-1728), third surviving son of Johann August, inherited Assenheim 1699, Rödelheim 1722Third creation: 1778–1806

 Johann Ernst Karl, Count 1778–90 (1714-1790), second surviving son of Ludwig Heinrich, inherited elder brother's territories 1778  Volrath Franz Karl Ludwig, Count 1790–1818 (1762-1818), mediatized 1806

After Mediatization

 Volrath Franz Karl Ludwig, Count 1790–1818 (1762-1818), mediatized 1806
  Karl, Count 1818-1844 (1790-1844)
  Maximilian, Count 1844-1892 (1826-1892)
  Karl Franz, Count 1892-1923 (1864-1923)
 Maximilian, Count 1923-1968 (1893-1968)
  Markwart, Count 1968-1976 (1925-1976), adopted Nikolaus as his successor  Count Joachim Ernst of Solms-Rödelheim-Assenheim (1896-1978)  Count Günther Wolfgang of Solms-Rödelheim-Assenheim (1931-1979)''
 Nikolaus, Count 1979-1981 (1961-1981)
  Philipp, Count 1981–present (born 1964)
  Theodor, Hereditary Count (born 2010)

Properties

References 

1699 disestablishments in Europe
States and territories established in 1722
States and territories disestablished in 1728
States and territories established in 1778
Counties of the Holy Roman Empire
1806 disestablishments in the Holy Roman Empire